John Malcolm Thorpe Fleming Churchill,  (16 September 1906 – 8 March 1996) was a British Army officer who fought in the Second World War with a longbow, a Scottish broadsword, and a bagpipe. Nicknamed "Fighting Jack Churchill" and "Mad Jack", he was known for the motto: "Any officer who goes into action without his sword is improperly dressed."

Early life
Churchill was born in Colombo, British Ceylon, to Alec Fleming Churchill (1876–1961), later of Hove, East Sussex, and Elinor Elizabeth, daughter of John Alexander Bond Bell, of Kelnahard, County Cavan, Ireland, and of Dimbula, Ceylon. Alec, of a family long settled at Deddington, Oxfordshire, had been District Engineer in the Ceylon Civil Service, in which his father, John Fleming Churchill (1829–1894), had also served. Soon after Jack's birth, the family returned to Dormansland, Surrey, where his younger brother, Thomas Bell Lindsay Churchill (1907–1990), was born. In 1910, the Churchills moved to British Hong Kong when Alec Churchill was appointed as Director of Public Works; he also served as a member of the Executive Council. The Churchills' third and youngest son, Robert Alec Farquhar Churchill, later a lieutenant in the Royal Navy and Fleet Air Arm, was born in Hong Kong in 1911. The family returned to England in 1917.

Churchill was educated at King William's College on the Isle of Man. He graduated from the Royal Military College, Sandhurst, in 1926 and served in Burma with the Manchester Regiment. He enjoyed riding a motorbike in Burma.

Churchill left the army in 1936 and worked as a newspaper editor in Nairobi, Kenya, and as a male model. He used his archery and bagpipe talents to play a small role in the 1924 film The Thief of Bagdad and also appeared in the 1938 film A Yank at Oxford. He took second place in the 1938 military piping competition at the Aldershot Tattoo. In 1939, he represented Great Britain at the World Archery Championships in Oslo.

Second World War

France (1940)

Churchill resumed his commission after Nazi Germany invaded Poland in September 1939 and was assigned to the Manchester Regiment, which was sent to France in the British Expeditionary Force. In May 1940, Churchill and some of his men ambushed a German patrol near L'Épinette (near Richebourg, Pas-de-Calais). Churchill gave the signal to attack by raising his broadsword. A common story is that Churchill killed a German with a longbow in that action. However, Churchill later said that his bows had been crushed by a lorry earlier in the campaign. After fighting at Dunkirk, he volunteered for the Commandos.

Jack's younger brother, Thomas Churchill, also served with and led a commando brigade during the war. After the war, Thomas wrote a book, Commando Crusade, that details some of the brothers' experiences during the war. Their youngest brother, Robert, also known as 'Buster', served in the Royal Navy and was killed in action in 1942.

Norway (1941)
Churchill was second in command of No. 3 Commando in Operation Archery, a raid on the German garrison at Vågsøy, Norway, on 27 December 1941. As the ramps fell on the first landing craft, he leapt forward from his position playing "March of the Cameron Men" on his bagpipes, before throwing a grenade and charging into battle. For his actions at Dunkirk and Vågsøy, Churchill received the Military Cross.

Italy (1943)

In July 1943, as commanding officer, he led No. 2 Commando from their landing site at Catania, in Sicily, with his trademark Scottish broadsword slung around his waist, a longbow and arrows around his neck and his bagpipes under his arm, which he also did in the landings at Salerno.

Leading 2 Commando, Churchill was ordered to capture a German observation post outside the town of Molina, controlling a pass leading down to the Salerno beachhead. With the help of a corporal, he infiltrated the town, captured the post and took 42 prisoners including a mortar squad. Churchill led the men and prisoners back down the pass, with the wounded being carried on carts pushed by German prisoners. He commented that it was "an image from the Napoleonic Wars". He received the Distinguished Service Order for leading that action at Salerno.

Churchill later walked back to the town to retrieve his sword, which he had lost in hand-to-hand combat with the German regiment. On his way there, he encountered a disoriented American patrol mistakenly walking towards enemy lines. When the NCO in command of the patrol refused to turn around, Churchill told them that he was going his own way and that he would not come back for a "bloody third time".

Yugoslavia (1944)
As part of Maclean Mission (Macmis), in 1944, he led the Commandos in Yugoslavia to support Josip Broz Tito's Partisans from the Adriatic island of Vis. In May he was ordered to raid the German-held island of Brač. He organized a "motley army" of 1,500 Partisans, 43 Commando and one troop from 40 Commando for the raid. The landing was unopposed, but on seeing the gun emplacements from which they later encountered German fire, the Partisans decided to defer the attack until the following day. Churchill's bagpipes signalled the remaining Commandos to battle. After being strafed by an RAF Spitfire, Churchill decided to withdraw for the night and to relaunch the attack the following morning.

Capture
The following morning, a flanking attack was launched by 43 Commando with Churchill leading the elements from 40 Commando. The Partisans remained at the landing area. Only Churchill and six others managed to reach the objective. A mortar shell killed or wounded everyone but Churchill, who was playing "Will Ye No Come Back Again?" on his pipes as the Germans advanced. He was knocked unconscious by grenades and captured. Believing that he might be related to Winston Churchill, German military intelligence had Churchill flown to Berlin for interrogation. Afterwards, he was transferred to a special compound for "prominent" POWs, including some actual or suspected relatives of Winston Churchill – within the grounds of Sachsenhausen concentration camp.

In September 1944, Churchill, three Royal Air Force officers (survivors of the great escape) and Major Johnnie Dodge escaped Sachsenhausen by using a tunnel that they had dug in secret. Churchill and Royal Air Force officer Bertram James attempted to walk to the Baltic coast. They were captured near the German coastal city of Rostock, a few kilometres from the sea.

In late April 1945, Churchill and about 140 other prominent concentration camp inmates were transferred to Tyrol and guarded by SS troops. A delegation of prisoners told senior German army officers that they feared they would be executed. A German army unit commanded by Captain Wichard von Alvensleben moved in to protect the prisoners. Outnumbered, the SS guards moved out and left the prisoners behind. The prisoners were released, and after the departure of the Germans, Churchill walked  to Verona, Italy, where he met an American armoured unit.

Burma (1945)

As the Pacific War was still on, Churchill was sent to Burma, where some of the largest land battles against Japan were being fought. By the time Churchill reached India, Hiroshima and Nagasaki had been bombed, and the war ended. Churchill was said to be unhappy with the sudden end of the war: "If it wasn't for those damn Yanks, we could have kept the war going another 10 years!"

Postwar

British Palestine
After the Second World War ended, Churchill qualified as a parachutist and transferred to the Seaforth Highlanders. He was soon posted to Mandatory Palestine as executive officer of the 1st Battalion, the Highland Light Infantry.

In the spring of 1948, just before the end of the British mandate in the region, he became involved in another conflict. Along with twelve of his soldiers, he attempted to assist the Hadassah medical convoy, which came under attack by Arab forces. Churchill, one of the first men on the scene, banged on a bus and offered to evacuate members of the convoy in an APC despite the British military orders to keep out of the fight. His offer was refused in the belief that the Jewish Haganah would come to their aid in an organised rescue. When no relief arrived, Churchill and his twelve men provided cover fire against the Arab forces.

 Two of the convoy trucks caught fire, and 77 of the 79 people inside of them were killed. The event is known today as the Hadassah medical convoy massacre.

Of the experience, he said: "About one hundred and fifty insurgents, armed with weapons varying from blunder-busses and old flintlocks to modern Sten and Bren guns, took cover behind a cactus patch in the grounds of the American Colony.... I went out and faced them." "About 250 rifle-men were on the edge of our property shooting at the convoy.... I begged them to desist from using the grounds of the American Colony for such a dastardly purpose."

After the massacre, he coordinated the evacuation of 700 Jewish doctors, students and patients from the Hadassah hospital on the Hebrew University campus on Mount Scopus in Jerusalem, where the convoy had been headed. The main road on Mount Scopus is today named "Churchill Boulevard" in his honor.

Further film appearance
In 1952, Metro-Goldwyn-Mayer produced the film Ivanhoe shot in Britain featuring Churchill's old rowing companion, Robert Taylor. The studio hired Churchill to appear as an archer, shooting from the walls of Warwick Castle.

Surfing
In later years, Churchill served as an instructor at the land-air warfare school in Australia, where he became a passionate surfer. In 1955, he was the first man to ride a tidal bore, doing so on a five-foot Severn bore wave for over a mile. This was accomplished by designing and building his own 16-foot toothpick surfboard. In riding that tidal bore, Churchill innovated freshwater surfing and established the idea that surfing could take place outside traditional coastal areas. It took years for the idea to gain traction, but tidal bores are now ridden in Brazil, China, Great Lakes, Munich and the Jackson Hole.

Retirement (1959–1996)
Churchill retired from the army in 1959. In retirement, his eccentricity continued. He startled train guards and passengers by throwing his briefcase out of the train window each day on the ride home. He later explained that he was tossing his case into his own back garden so that he would not have to carry it from the station. He also enjoyed sailing coal-fired ships on the Thames between Richmond and Oxford, as well as making radio-controlled model warships.

Death
Churchill died on 8 March 1996 at 89 years old, in the county of Surrey.

In March 2014, the Royal Norwegian Explorers Club published a book that featured Churchill, naming him as one of the finest explorers and adventurers of all time.

Family
Churchill married Rosamund Margaret Denny, the daughter of Sir Maurice Edward Denny and granddaughter of Sir Archibald Denny, on 8 March 1941. They had two children, Malcolm John Leslie Churchill, born 1942, and Rodney Alistair Gladstone Churchill, born 1947.

See also

Notes

References

External links
 Imperial War Museum Interview
 

People educated at King William's College
Manchester Regiment officers
Highland Light Infantry officers
British Army personnel of World War II
World War II prisoners of war held by Germany
Graduates of the Royal Military College, Sandhurst
1906 births
1996 deaths
British World War II prisoners of war
Sachsenhausen concentration camp survivors
British Army Commandos officers
Recipients of the Military Cross
Companions of the Distinguished Service Order
Seaforth Highlanders officers
British military personnel of the Palestine Emergency
English male archers
Military archers
People from Colombo
British male models